DXND (90.1 FM) was a radio station owned and operated by GMA Network, Inc. The station's studio and transmitter were located at the Norpen Bldg., Roxas Ave., Brgy. Poblacion, Iligan.

History
DXND was launched on March 1, 1995, as Campus Radio 90.1, carrying a mass-based format. On March 1, 2004, it rebranded as 90.1 Wow FM, similar to its sister station in Davao (now Barangay FM 103.5 Davao). It lasted until February 14, 2007, when it brought back its Campus Radio branding. On February 17, 2014, it became a relay station of DZBB in Manila. In the 1st quarter of 2022, it rebranded simply as DXND with the slogan Ang FM ng Iligan. It reduced its simulcasting of DZBB to give way to automated music programming at times. As of October 2022, the station is off the air.

References

See also
GMA TV-11 Iligan
GMA Network

Radio stations in Iligan
News and talk radio stations in the Philippines
Radio stations established in 1995
Super Radyo stations